Abdul Muid bin Abdul Latif (24 February 1979 – 11 April 2020) was a Malaysian-based web designer, graphic designer and digital artist who is known for promoting the cultural elements of the Southeast Asia from Batik and Songket into his commercial works and artworks.

Muid was the Project Lead for Creative Commons Malaysia who actively promote Free culture movement and open collaboration. Muid was one of the official Behance Ambassadors representing Malaysia and the author of 'Mekarnya Cinta Kata-kata dan Puisi' e-book, a part of initiative to help the Creative Commons movement in fostering Free content awareness and Going green campaign.

Biography

After obtaining a bachelor's degree in fine arts from the University Technology Mara (UiTM) Shah Alam, Selangor, Malaysia in 2001, Muid worked at a few web agencies and design studios providing creative assistance for online campaigns, such as Maxis Hotlink, Petronas's Petrosains Discovery Centre, Toyota and Microsoft Singapore.

Muid was an active supporter of Creative Commons and he sat as one of the board members in Creative Commons Malaysia until 2008 and in 2011 onwards, he was appointed as Project Lead of Creative Commons Malaysia to promote the free culture movement and translation of latest version of Creative Commons licenses to Malay language. Muid founded Digital Malaya Project (DMP), a collective art group that supports Malaysia's creative multimedia industry in 2001. Digital Malaya Project has been participating in art exhibitions from Malaysia to Singapore, Jakarta, Bangkok, Japan and Germany, and has been involved in pro-bono projects and campaigns with the Malaysian AIDS Council, Yahoo! Flickr Malaysia group, government bodies and NGO such as Perdana Leadership Foundation. Digital Malaya Project has been supporting the Malaysian Art and Design scene for almost ten years and was appointed by Adobe (ADAA committee members) to support the Adobe Design Achievement Awards 2008 as the official media supporter. Digital Malaya Project was nominated as 'Best Selection' in the WebCuts 2006 held in Germany and was a finalist for the MSC Malaysia APICTA 2002 Best Student Project Awards. Muid was involved as an ambassador to Kuala Lumpur Design Week (KLDW) 2009 and 2010 and also showcased collaborations with Southeast Asian Designers such as Drew Europeo, Tony Ariawan, Amenth, Firdaus Mahadi and many others. Muid was involved as one of the final judges for 6th and 8th Philippines Web Awards alongside Joshua Davis, Adhemas Batista and Carole Guevin and MSC Malaysia Kre8tif! Industry Awards judges for Digital Art Category in 2009 and 2010. Continuing his success in judging international awards and competitions, Muid was certified twice in 2012 and 2013 by the Ministry of Human 
Resources (Malaysia) for his contributions in mapping the curriculum and syllabus in 3d animation for the Malaysian Skills Certification System. and Malaysia Website Awards 2016 (MWA2016).

As an ASEF (Asia-Europe Foundation) alumnus, Muid presented his paperwork on Malaysia's New media Practice and Policy development at the Mini Summit on New Media Arts Policy and Practice July 2008 in conjunction with International Symposium of Electronic Art (ISEA2008), Singapore, and also presented "How Does CC (Creative Commons) Works For Photographers" at the National Art Gallery, Kuala Lumpur in conjunction with ASEF Emerging Photographer's Forum 2009.

In October 2010, Muid became the first digital artist in Malaysia to perform a live digital art show (using Adobe Photoshop) together with the Malaysian Philharmonic Orchestra under the talented conductor, Harish Shankar, during the KLCC Art festival

'Malaysian Artist for Unity', a pro-bono project by Malaysians created to gain more awareness for people to work together, embracing unity without prejudice and discrimination due to racial tension and racism that is happening around the world. 'Here in My Home' was Muid's first commercial involvement as a cast and crew. This project was produced by Pete Teo and directed by Yasmin Ahmad and film director, Ho Yuhang. Muid had also to contribute to Malaysian Book of Records as an illustrator for the Longest Comic Banner in Asia dated March 2008, located in PTWC, Kuala Lumpur during the Comic Fiesta and was a creative consultant to Multimedia Development Corporation (MDeC) after working on Malaysia first 3D animated series called Saladin, The Animated Series which was nominated in the International Emmy Awards 2011. Muid  worked as an independent new media specialist and developer, giving talks for local art and design institutions, volunteering for charity for NGO and handling various creative works and campaigns from creative writing, web designs and multimedia development including Puteri Gunung Ledang: The Musical Season 3, cover art, creative campaigns for local and international recording artists. Muid was also a member of Graphic Design Association of Malaysia (wREGA); wREGA which is the only official authorised graphic design association in Malaysia (affiliated with ICOGRADA since 2001) and is also a non-profit, non-political organisation with the objective of encouraging professional practice and promoting design excellence in the art and science of visual communication in commerce, trade, industry and education, both locally and internationally. From 2011 onwards, Muid has extensively created a series of space art and exhibited in major art galleries like Petronas Gallery and Penang State Art Gallery in conjunction with 'Young Malaysian Artists II' exhibition.

Influence

Muid was the Third generation of Digital Artist in Malaysia along with other successful Digital Artists such as Aadi Salman (who works on Graphic novel 'Silent Hill'), Milx (who works with Marvel Comics of Silver Surfer, Fytullah Hamzah (Kromosom), Tan Jin Ho, and others. 
A few of Muid's digital artworks like 'Lovely Disturbia' are currently in the 2012 permanent collection of Penang State Art Gallery located in George Town, Penang and Bank Negara Malaysia Museum and Art Gallery Collection in 2015 & 2016.

Muid's digital art on canvas printing called ‘Better Together’, produced in conjunction with the World AIDS Day 2015 celebration organised by Kakiseni and ONE Condom Malaysia was auctioned for RM20,000.

Exhibitions

Selected group exhibition and showcase:

 2017 - 'Nature Nurtured' (Group Exhibition), Bank Negara Malaysia Museum and Art Gallery, Sasana Kijang, Kuala Lumpur, Malaysia
 2016 - Flora and Fauna at ACC (Group Exhibition) in conjunction with Merdeka 59 Exhibition, Art Gallery, Bank Negara Malaysia Museum and Art Gallery, Sasana Kijang, Kuala Lumpur, Malaysia
 2016 - Flora and Fauna at ACC (Group Exhibition), Bank Negara Malaysia Headquarters, Kuala Lumpur, Malaysia
 2016 - Flora and Fauna at ACC (Group Exhibition), Bank Negara Malaysia, Batu Tiga, Shah Alam, Selangor, Malaysia 
 2015 - 'Star Wars Art Force Salute' Group Exhibition, Star Wars Fan Festival Taiwan, SYNTREND Space Mall, Taipei, Taiwan
 2015 - 'Designber Fest' Group Exhibition, Pier 2, Kaohsiung, Taiwan
 2014 - B0dy_m0vement showcase with Perezoldskool, Pause Fest 2014, Federation Square Big Screen, Melbourne, Australia
 2014 - Young Malaysian Artists II Exhibition, Penang State Art Gallery, Penang, Malaysia
 2013 - Creative Cities (Kaohsiung Design Festival), Pier 2 Art Centre, Kaohsiung, Taiwan
 2013 - Young Malaysian Artists II, Petronas Gallery, KLCC, Kuala Lumpur, Malaysia
 2013 - Digital Malaya Project Group Exhibition, Future + Traditions, Digital Photography and Video Installation, Art Row, PUBLIKA Solaris Dutamas, Kuala Lumpur, Malaysia
 2012 - Beautiful Junk Exhibition, In Studio @ Straits, Armenian Street, Georgetown, Penang, Malaysia
 2012 - Behance Malaysia 2nd Group Exhibition (Akar & Kukubesi Vol.II), Galeri Shah Alam, Shah Alam, Selangor, Malaysia
 2011 - INSIGHT Asia Creative Culture Exhibition, Red Gallery, East London, London, United Kingdom
 2011 - Behance Malaysia 1st Group Exhibition, PUBLIKA Solaris Dutamas, Kuala Lumpur, Malaysia
 2011 - AKAR & KUKUBESI Group Exhibition, Galeri Shah Alam, Selangor, Malaysia
 2010 - INSIGHT, Contemporary Malaysian Designers Exhibition, Centre for Creative Communications (CCC), Shizuoka, Japan
 2010 - Live Digital Art Performance with Malaysian Philharmonic Orchestra, Petronas Philharmonic Hall KLCC, Kuala Lumpur, Malaysia
 2010 - Digitization, In Conjunction with KL Design Week 2010 (NOVA), Petronas Gallery, Suria KLCC, Kuala Lumpur, Malaysia
 2009 - Digitization, Digital Art Exhibition, Siam Paragon, Bangkok, Thailand
 2009 - Young Tiger Showcase, Kuala Lumpur Design Week 2009, CapSquare Mall, Kuala Lumpur, Malaysia
 2008 - UOX Play, Sg. Wang Plaza Rooftop, Kuala Lumpur, Malaysia
 2008 - Miss Hua Journey to Nanyang Exhibition, Han Chiang College, Penang, Malaysia
 2008 - Digital Malaya Project Group Exhibition III, Urbanscapes, Kuala Lumpur Performing Arts Centre (KLPAC), Kuala Lumpur, Malaysia
 2008 - Get Moovable Moving Art Exhibition, Palate Palette Restaurant and Bar, Kuala Lumpur, Malaysia
 2007 - Let Arts Move You (LAMU) Festival, Kuala Lumpur Sentral, Kuala Lumpur, Malaysia
 2006 - DIGI-Starbucks Music Series exhibition, Starbucks, Centrepoint, Bandar Utama, Petaling Jaya, Selangor, Malaysia
 2006 - Kingdom of Rebel, Digital Malaya Project Video Screening, Pelita Hati Gallery, Bangsar, Kuala Lumpur, Malaysia
 2006 - Massive Territory Group Exhibition, National Gallery of Indonesia, Jakarta, Indonesia
 2006 - Poster Show, Wondermilk Uptown, Petaling Jaya, Selangor, Malaysia
 2006 - EX2, Digital Art Exhibition, Galleriiizu, Wisma UOA, Jalan Pinang, Kuala Lumpur, Malaysia
 2005 - aRtY ParTy Video Showcase, Galleriiizu, Wisma UOA, Jalan Pinang, Kuala Lumpur, Malaysia
 2005 - ‘7’, An Exhibition, Galleriiizu, Wisma UOA, Jalan Pinang, Kuala Lumpur, Malaysia
 2005 - Open House, Gema Rimba Gallery, Bukit Tunku, Kuala Lumpur, Malaysia
 2005 - Digital Malaya Project Group Exhibition II, NotThatBalai Art Festival, Taman Seputeh, Kuala Lumpur, Malaysia
 2005 - Beautiful Junk Exhibition, Dewan Sri Pinang, Georgetown, Penang, Malaysia
 2004 - Digital Malaya Project Group Exhibition, NotThatBalai Festival, Taman Seputeh, Kuala Lumpur, Malaysia
 2004 - Undiscovered Territory, Berjaya Time Square, Kuala Lumpur, Malaysia
 2004 - Digital Malaya Group Exhibition, SAYA Art Festival, PSC Perdana Shopping Centre, Damansara Perdana, Petaling Jaya, Selangor, Malaysia
 2004 - Urbanscapes, Kuala Lumpur Sentral (Open Space), Kuala Lumpur, Malaysia
 2003 - Merdeka Young Malaysian Designer Group Exhibition, INTEC College Gallery, Jalan Klang Lama, Kuala Lumpur, Malaysia
 2002 - Digital Malaya Project showcase @ MSC APICTA, Sri Pentas, TV3, Petaling Jaya, Selangor, Malaysia
 2001 - Remixed Exhibition, Final Degree Showcase, Faculty of Art & Design, University Technology MARA (UiTM), Shah Alam, Selangor, Malaysia
 1997-98 - Art Market, Foyer FSSR, University Technology MARA (UiTM), Shah Alam, Selangor, Malaysia

References

External links

 Digital Malaya Project
 16 Young Upcoming Local Artists Whose Art Will Mesmerize You
 Lomography Magazine – Interview with Malaysian Artist Muid Latif
 Meet The Artist: Muid Latif by Nelissa Hilman
 Kaohsiung, A Hidden Creative City by Muid Latif
 Utusan Malaysia – Duta Muda Seni Digital, Muid Latif (In Malay Language)
 Budiey - Malaysian Entertainment Blogger Interviews Muid Latif (In Malay Language)
 Kreatiview #1: Muid Latif (In Malay Language)
 'By all means, create!' originally written by Siti Syameen Md Khalili of New Straits Times, November 2012.

1979 births
2020 deaths
People from Penang
Malaysian people of Malay descent
Malaysian artists
Digital artists
Universiti Teknologi MARA alumni